Mniszów-Kolonia  is a village in the administrative district of Gmina Nowe Brzesko, within Proszowice County, Lesser Poland Voivodeship, in southern Poland.

The village has an approximate population of 160.

References

Villages in Proszowice County